"Two Ghosts" is a song recorded by English singer and songwriter Harry Styles for his self-titled debut studio album. The song was written by Styles, John Ryan, Julian Bunetta, Mitch Rowland and Tyler Johnson and its production was handled by Jeff Bhasker, Alex Salibian and Johnson. It was released as the second single from the album to US adult contemporary radio by Columbia Records on 7 August 2017, and to pop radio the next day.

Composition
"Two Ghosts" is a country-influenced folk rock ballad. Performed on slide guitar, the track leans toward country folk. Lyrically, it is about a relationship that did not last and the singer trying to reclaim his sense of humanity after its end, according to critics. An editor from Entertainment Weekly interpreted the song as a "mournful acoustic autopsy of love lost." Written in the key of E major and set in a common time signature, it has a relatively slow tempo of 70 beats per minute.

Critical reception
Leonie Cooper of NME opined the "subtle" song offers up a "country-indebted Laurel Canyon sound." In Pitchfork, Jamieson Cox considered Styles "makes a convincing alt-country troubadour" on the song. Anjali Raguraman of The Straits Times thought the "sombre, country-tinged" track lyrically borrows from Pink Floyd's "Wish You Were Here". In the Los Angeles Times, Mikael Wood commented that the song has "the slow-rolling swagger of The Rolling Stones' "Tumbling Dice." In Consequence of Sound, David Sackllah noted the slide guitar "could fit on Ryan Adams' Gold." Chicago Tribunes Greg Kot wrote "forlorn references drop to the Allman Brothers' "Melissa" on the song." Annie Zaleski of The A.V. Club wrote it "acutely captures the discomfiting, empty feeling of realizing that the spark is gone."

Kitty Empire of The Guardian said it "packs some good writing." Allan Raible in ABC News found the song influenced by George Harrison's "All Things Must Pass." Rob Sheffield of Rolling Stone thought the "lovelorn" song "could pass for vintage Bread. Eve Barlow of Variety believed "it's very easy to imagine an extended hyper emotional scene from The Notebook in the background" while listening to the "tragic, mystifying tale." In a similar way, David Dunn of The National thought its "plaintive" hooks and "easy-going" strum helps the song fits in a "teary" scene of Grey's Anatomy. BBC Music reporter Mark Savage noted references to Taylor Swift's "Style" in the storied lyrics; Pitchforks Cox stated the song "only succeeds because it leans" on these references. In an interview with Nick Grimshaw on BBC Radio 1, Styles said in response to whether the song was about Swift: "I think it's pretty self-explanatory."

Billboards critics' list placed it seventh on "Every One Direction Solo Single, Ranked" in May 2017, stating "a plaintive strummer in the mold of Beck at his most contemplative or Ryan Adams at his most hungover, "Two Ghosts" is largely underplayed and undeniably effective [...] Not as grand or as riotous as some of Harry Styles' more obvious highlights, but sweetly winning all the same."

Live performances
On 17 May 2017, Styles performed "Two Ghosts" on The Late Late Show with James Corden, accompanying himself on acoustic guitar. In Rolling Stone, Elias Leight opined the singer demonstrated "impressive" vocal range, contorting his voice into a "bruising" rasp and a "light, angsty" falsetto moments later. On 9 June, Styles performed the song from the rooftop of London venue Central Hall Westminster on The Late Late Show.

Charts

Certifications

Release history

References

External links

2010s ballads
2017 songs
2017 singles
Harry Styles songs
Songs written by Harry Styles
Songs written by John Ryan (musician)
Songs written by Julian Bunetta
Songs written by Tyler Johnson (musician)
Song recordings produced by Jeff Bhasker
Columbia Records singles
British folk rock songs
Folk ballads
Rock ballads